Adrian Anthony Mayes (born November 17, 1980) is a former NFL and CFL linebacker.

Early life
Mayes was born in Houston, Texas, where he attended Forest Brook High School.

Playing career

College career
Mayes played college football as a linebacker and safety at LSU from 2000 to 2003.

Professional career
Mayes played in the National Football League with the Arizona Cardinals, in NFL Europe with the Berlin Thunder, in the Arena Football League with the Columbus Destroyers and in the Canadian Football League with the Toronto Argonauts.

References

External links
 Toronto Argonauts profile page
 NFL stats

1980 births
Living people
People from Houston
American football linebackers
LSU Tigers football players
Arizona Cardinals players
Berlin Thunder players
American players of Canadian football
Canadian football linebackers
Toronto Argonauts players
Forest Brook High School alumni